William de Bradshaigh (fl. 1313–1331) was an English politician.

He was a Member (MP) of the Parliament of England for Lancashire in 1313, January 1316, 1325, 1328, 1330 and 1331.

References

13th-century births
14th-century deaths
English MPs 1313
English MPs 1316
English MPs 1325
English MPs 1328
English MPs 1330
English MPs 1331
Members of the Parliament of England (pre-1707) for Lancashire